The Seventh Nitish Kumar ministry was a Council of Ministers in Bihar Legislative Assembly headed by Chief Minister Nitish Kumar.

Council of Ministers
The members of the Council of Ministers are as follows: 

|}

See also 

 Government of Bihar
 Bihar Legislative Assembly
 List of science and technology ministers of Bihar
 Nitish Kumar second ministry
 Nitish Kumar fifth ministry (2015 - 2017)

References

Bharatiya Janata Party
Janata Dal (United)
2021 in Indian politics
Bihar ministries
Nitish Kumar
Hindustani Awam Morcha
Vikassheel Insaan Party
2021 establishments in Bihar
Cabinets established in 2021
7